Argillite is an unincorporated community on the Little Sandy River in Greenup County, Kentucky, United States.  It sits at the southern end of the confluence of Kentucky Routes 1 and 207.  The name refers to argillite, a type of stone, related to shale.

Argillite was a stop along the Eastern Kentucky Railway between the Simonton and Laurel stops. 
Argillite's ZIP Code is 41121.

Notable person
Jeremy Bates, heavyweight boxer

References

Unincorporated communities in Greenup County, Kentucky
Unincorporated communities in Kentucky